A trench is a narrow depression in the ground. 

Trench or Trenches  may also refer to:

Arts, entertainment, and media
 Trench (album), a 2018 album by Twenty One Pilots
 "Trenches" (Pop Evil song), 2013
 Trenches (Monica and Lil Baby song), 2020
 Trenches (video game), a 2009 game for iPhone/iPod
 Trenches (web series), a 2010 sci-fi TV series

Biology and healthcare
Trench fever (also known as "five-day fever", "quintan fever"  febris quintana in Latin, and "urban trench fever"), a moderately serious disease transmitted by body lice
 Trench foot, also known as immersion foot, a medical condition caused by prolonged exposure of the feet to damp and cold
 Trench mouth, acute necrotizing ulcerative gingivitis

Other uses
 Trench (surname) includes list of people with the name
 Trench, Telford, Shropshire, England
 Trench Crossing railway station, a former station in Shropshire
 Oceanic trench, a topographic depression of the sea floor
 Trench coat, a type of coat garment originally worn in trench warfare
 Trench Town, Jamaica
 Trench warfare, the kind of warfare defined by fortified earth defences

See also
 Entrenchment (disambiguation), related terms
 Trenchard (disambiguation) 
 Trencher (disambiguation)
 Trenchmouth